Enrique Villalobos Brassart (born November 20, 1965 in Madrid, Spain) is a retired basketball player. He played eight times with the Spain national team.

Clubs
1983-84: Real Canoe
1984-86: CB Málaga
1986-88: Cajamadrid
1988-92: Real Madrid
1992-93: Saski Baskonia
1993-97: BC Andorra
1997-98: CB Granada
1998-99: Cholet Basket
1999-00: Olympique Antibes

Awards
Copa del Rey (1): 1988-89
Saporta Cup (2): 1988-89, 1991–92
French Cup (1): 1998-99

References
 ACB profile

1965 births
Living people
Baloncesto Málaga players
BC Andorra players
Spanish expatriate basketball people in Andorra
CB Granada players
Cholet Basket players
Liga ACB players
Olympique Antibes basketball players
Real Madrid Baloncesto players
Saski Baskonia players
Small forwards
Spanish expatriate basketball people in France
Spanish men's basketball players
Basketball players from Madrid
Real Canoe NC basketball players